Baghdad Ansar is a village around 3.5 km from Dhampur of District Bijnor

Villages in Bijnor district